A bear claw is a sweet, yeast-raised pastry, a type of Danish, originating in the United States during the mid-1910's. In Denmark, a bear claw is referred to as kamme. France also have an alternate version of that pastry: patte d'ours (meaning bear paw), created in 1982 in the Alps. The name bear claw as used for a pastry is first attested in March 1914 by the Geibel German Bakery, located at 915 K Street in downtown Sacramento. The phrase is more common in Western American English, and is included in the U.S. Regional Dialect Survey Results, Question #87, "Do you use the term 'bear claw' for a kind of pastry?"

Ingredients and shape 
Most Danishes include the same basic ingredients such as eggs, yeast, flour, milk, sugar, and butter. The bear claw is also made with "sweet dough" which is "bread dough with more shortening than usual". One of the differences between most Danishes, besides taste, is seen in their shape. A bear claw is usually filled with almond paste, and sometimes raisins, and often shaped in a semicircle with slices along the curved edge, or rectangular with partial slices along one side. As the dough rises, the sections separate, evoking the shape of a bear's toes, hence the name. A bear claw may also be a yeast doughnut in a shape similar to that of the pastry. Such doughnuts may have an apple pie-style filling, or other fillings such as butter pecan, dates, cream cheese, grape or cherry.

Production 
A bear claw can be made by hand or by machine. Bear claw can be hand-made by using a bear claw cutter that was invented in 1950 by James Fennell. A 1948 patent describes the process of assembling the bear claw as rolling out the dough, layering filling onto it, folding the dough over, cutting small incisions to create the claw-like look, and finally cutting the dough into separate pastries. The pastry can be curved into a half-circle at this point, which causes the "toes" to separate.

Health and nutrition 
Similar to other pastries, the bear claw is typically high in carbohydrates and fats. Example nutrition information can be seen from a version produced by the restaurant chain Panera Bread.

See also
Banket (pastry) - An almond-stuffed pastry from the Netherlands
 List of pastries
 List of regional dishes of the United States

References

Pastries
Almond desserts
American doughnuts